Callionymus japonicus, the Japanese longtail dragonet, is a species of dragonet native to the western Pacific Ocean where it is found at a depth of around .  This species grows to a length of  SL.

References

External links
 Photos of Callionymus japonicus in iNaturalist

J
Fish described in 1782
Taxa named by Martinus Houttuyn